Lloyd Bruce (May 15, 1907 - March 28, 1988) was a professional baseball pitcher in the Negro leagues. He played with the Chicago American Giants in 1940.

In some contemporary newspaper reports, he is referred to as Sam Bruce.

References

External links
 and Seamheads

Chicago American Giants players
1907 births
1988 deaths
Baseball pitchers
Baseball players from Texas
People from Sherman, Texas
20th-century African-American sportspeople